Edmund Roman Zieliński (24 November 1909 – 8 December 1992) was a Polish ice hockey player. He played for AZS Poznań during his career, winning the 1934 Polish league championship. He also played for the Polish national team at the 1936 Winter Olympics, and the 1935 World Championship.

References

External links
 

1909 births
1992 deaths
Ice hockey players at the 1936 Winter Olympics
Olympic ice hockey players of Poland
People from Chełmno County
Sportspeople from Kuyavian-Pomeranian Voivodeship
Polish ice hockey forwards
Burials at Służew Old Cemetery